Farenthold is a surname. Notable people with the surname include:

 Frances Farenthold (1926–2021), known as "Sissy", female Democratic U.S. politician, Texas House of Representatives
 David Fahrenthold, journalist, The Washington Post
 Blake Farenthold (born 1961), male Republican U.S. politician, U.S. House of Representatives